W34 or W.34 may refer to :
 W34 (nuclear warhead), a 1960s American nuclear bomb
 Hansa-Brandenburg W.33, a Hansa-Brandenburg aircraft
 Junkers W 34, a German-built, single-engine, passenger- and transport aircraft
 Shiocton Airport, an airport in Wisconsin with the FAA identifier (W34)